Tasmanentulus is a genus of proturans in the family Acerentomidae.

Species
 Tasmanentulus intermedius Tuxen, 1986
 Tasmanentulus similis (Tuxen, 1967)
 Tasmanentulus tasmanicus (Tuxen, 1967)

References

Protura
Invertebrates of Tasmania